Bankier is a surname. Notable people with the surname include:

 David Bankier (1947–2010), Israeli historian
 Ian Bankier (born 1952), Scottish businessman
 Imogen Bankier (born 1987), Scottish badminton player, daughter of Ian Bankier
 William Bankier (1870–1949), Scottish strongman and performer